Arend Johannes "Arend Jan" Boekestijn (27 September 1959, Amstelveen) is a Dutch politician, who was a member of the Dutch House of Representatives from 30 November 2006 through 18 November 2009. He resigned after sharing information with the press regarding a confidential conversation with the Queen of the Netherlands.

See also
List of Dutch politicians

References

1959 births
Living people
20th-century Dutch historians
Dutch political commentators
Members of the House of Representatives (Netherlands)
People's Party for Freedom and Democracy politicians
People from Amstelveen
Vrije Universiteit Amsterdam alumni
21st-century Dutch politicians